The 2022–23 Azerbaijan Cup is the 31st season of the annual cup competition in Azerbaijan, with Premier League side Qarabağ being the defending champions from the 2021–22 season.

Teams

First round
On 23 November, the AFFA published the list of referee appointments for the First Round games.

Quarterfinals
On 7 December, the AFFA published the list of referee appointments for the first legs of the Quarterfinals.

Semi–finals

Final

Scorers

3 goals:

 Emmanuel Apeh - Sabah

2 goals:

 Ramon - Gabala
 Farid Nabiyev - Kapaz
 Musa Qurbanlı - Qarabağ
 Davit Volkovi - Sabah
 Franco Mazurek - Sabail

1 goals:

 Isnik Alimi - Gabala
 Magsad Isayev - Gabala
 Ulvi Isgandarov - Gabala
 Emil Safarov - Gabala
 Felipe Santos - Gabala
 Omar Hani - Gabala
 Mikheil Ergemlidze - Kapaz
 Abdullahi Shuaibu - Kapaz
 Emin Mahmudov - Neftçi
 Yegor Bogomolsky - Neftçi
 Kenny Saief - Neftçi
 Bəxtiyar Həsənalızadə - Sabah
 Cristian Ceballos - Sabah
 Franco Mazurek - Sabail
 Mirabdulla Abbasov - Sabail
 Adilkhan Garahmadov - Sabail
 Goba Zakpa - Sabail
 Luwagga Kizito - Sabail
 Maksym Chekh - Sabail
 Faig Hajiyev - Turan Tovuz
 Khayal Najafov - Turan Tovuz
 Ehtiram Shahverdiyev - Turan Tovuz
 Rooney Wankewai - Turan Tovuz
 Nathan Oduwa - Turan Tovuz
 Rustam Akhmedzade - Zira
 Ragim Sadykhov - Zira
 Loris Brogno - Zira
 Dimitrios Chantakias - Zira

See also
 2022–23 Azerbaijan Premier League
 2022–23 Azerbaijan First Division

References

Azerbaijan Cup seasons
Azerbaijan
Cup